Herrad Rosemarie Hornung-Wehrung (19 August 1925 – 11 December 2010) was a German soprano and an academic voice teacher.

Career 
Wehrung was born in Münster, Westphalia, the daughter of the Protestant theologian . She studied voice at the Mozarteum in Salzburg with Günther Baum, in Stuttgart and at the Hochschule für Musik Freiburg with Margarethe von Winterfeldt. She was active from 1950 and 1975 as a concert singer, appearing in Europe. She collaborated with the composers Helmut Bornefeld and Siegfried Reda.

She lived in Tübingen, where her father had worked since 1931. She co-founded the Tübinger Kammermusikkreis (Tübingen chamber music circle) in 1944. She died in Tübingen.

References

External links 
 Kurzbiografie bei bach-cantatas

German sopranos
Academic staff of the State University of Music and Performing Arts Stuttgart
1925 births
2010 deaths
People from Münster
20th-century German musicians
20th-century German women singers